John "Happy" Townsend (April 9, 1879 – December 21, 1963), was a Major League Baseball pitcher from  to . He played for the Philadelphia Phillies, Washington Senators, and Cleveland Naps.

Townsend started his career with the Phillies in 1901, but after the season he jumped to Washington of the new American League. He pitched there for four seasons, finishing with a record of 22–69. In 1904, he led the league in both losses (26) and wild pitches (19).

In 2005, the Delaware Sports Museum and Hall of Fame inducted Townsend.

External links

 (contains information about Townsend)

1879 births
1963 deaths
Major League Baseball pitchers
Baseball players from Wilmington, Delaware
Philadelphia Phillies players
Washington Senators (1901–1960) players
Cleveland Indians players
Columbus Senators players
Williamsport Millionaires players
Washington College Shoremen baseball players